Christian Rabjerg Madsen (born 24 March 1986 in Silkeborg) is a Danish politician, who has served as Minister of the Interior and Housing since 2022. He has been a member of the Folketing for the Social Democrats political party since 2015.

Political career
In autumn 2013, Madsen's tour of the country with Ahmed Akkari debating on the topic of Islamism led to disturbances including stone-throwing.

Madsen was elected into parliament in the 2015 Danish general election, where he received 5,201	votes. He was reelected in 2019 with 6,319 votes.

Personal life
In June 2014, Madsen married Anne Brink Pedersen. They have to children together.

References

External links
 

Social Democrats (Denmark) politicians
People from Silkeborg
1986 births
Living people
Members of the Folketing 2015–2019
Members of the Folketing 2019–2022
Members of the Folketing 2022–2026